Craig Eddie is a Scottish singer from New Carron, Falkirk. He won the tenth series of The Voice UK.

Early life
Craig was born in New Carron, Falkirk to Craig and Tracey Eddie, and attended St. Mungo's High School. Before pursuing music, he worked in a call centre, an Asda warehouse and in Greggs.

Career
In 2021, Craig auditioned for the tenth series of The Voice UK, and joined Anne-Marie's team. After performing his own composition "Come Waste My Time", he was announced as the winner of the series.

Personal life
Craig suffers from anxiety and depression, but says music is his therapy and it gets him through hard times.

Discography

Extended plays

Singles

References

Scottish male singer-songwriters
Living people
The Voice (franchise) winners
The Voice UK contestants
1998 births
People from Falkirk (council area)
21st-century British male singers